is a passenger railway station in located in the city of Ise, Mie Prefecture, Japan, operated by Central Japan Railway Company (JR Tōkai).

Lines
Futaminoura Station is served by the Sangū Line, and is located 21.4 rail kilometers from the terminus of the line at Taki Station.

Station layout
The station consists of one island platform connected to the station building by an underground passage. The station building is designed to resemble the famed ”Wedded Rocks” after which the station is named.

Platforms

Adjacent stations

|-

History
Futaminoura Station opened on July 21, 1911 as a station on the Japanese Government Railways (JGR) Sangū Line, which became the Japan National Railways (JNR) after World War II. A new station building was completed in 1942; however, the station was rebuilt 300 meters from its original location in 1953. The station was absorbed into the JR Central network upon the privatization of the JNR on April 1, 1987. A new station building was completed in 1993. The station has been unattended since April 2011.

Passenger statistics
In fiscal 2019, the station was used by an average of 259 passengers daily (boarding passengers only).

Surrounding area
The Wedded Rocks (Futami Okitama Shrine)
Edo Wonderland
Sun Arena
Japan National Route 42

See also
List of railway stations in Japan

References

External links

Railway stations in Japan opened in 1911
Railway stations in Mie Prefecture
Ise, Mie